The men's 2 × 10 kilometre pursuit cross-country skiing competition at the 2002 Winter Olympics in Salt Lake City, United States, was held on 14 February at Soldier Hollow.

The competition consisted of two races. The first was a 10 kilometre classical race. Then, there was a 10 km freestyle pursuit where the competitors started based on the times from the classical event. The winner of the race was the first competitor(s) to finish the second race.

Results

References

Men's cross-country skiing at the 2002 Winter Olympics
Men's pursuit cross-country skiing at the Winter Olympics